Alexander Leslie Gallagher (10 July 1904 – 25 August 1973) was an Australian rules footballer who played with St Kilda and Richmond in the Victorian Football League (VFL).

Family
The son of John Gallagher (1850-1935), and Georgina Barbara Gallagher (1862-1933), née Ridgewell, Alexander Leslie Gallagher was born at Warragul on 10 July 1904.

He married Edna Lillian Turland (1910-1971) in 1936.

He had 4 Children with Edna, John Leslie (born 31/10/1937 - 28/02/2022), Keith, Bruce and Ruth. 
 
His cousin, Norman Henry John "Harry" Weidner (1907-1962), also played VFL football for Richmond.

Football

St Kilda (VFL)
Gallagher was from Elsternwick originally and spent his first two league seasons at St Kilda, as a forward. He kicked five goals against South Melbourne in just his second VFL appearance.

Richmond (VFL)
With Richmond he was used as a centreman and played in both the 1927 VFL Grand Final and 1928 VFL Grand Finals. He finished on the losing team on each occasion.

Brighton (VFA)
He was cleared from Richmond to Brighton on 23 April 1930.

Warrnambool (WDFL)
In April 1931, on the grounds that he had been offered the position of captain-coach, he was granted a clearance from Brighton to Warrnambool Football Club in the Western District Football League.

Death
He died at Warrnambool on 25 August 1973.

Notes

References
 
 Hogan P: The Tigers Of Old, Richmond FC, (Melbourne), 1996. 
 Victorian League Football: Richmond Team, The Australasian, (Saturday, 17 September 1927), p.84.

External links
 
 
 Les Gallagher at Boyles Football Photos.
 Les A. Gallagher at The VFA Project.

1904 births
1973 deaths
Australian rules footballers from Victoria (Australia)
St Kilda Football Club players
Richmond Football Club players
Brighton Football Club players
Warrnambool Football Club players
Warrnambool Football Club coaches
People from Warragul